Hermite is a lunar impact crater located along the northern lunar limb, close to the north pole of the Moon. Named for Charles Hermite, the crater was formed roughly 3.91 billion years ago. Hermite's southwestern edge is the coldest place currently known in the Solar System.

Physical features
Hermite is a worn, eroded crater with a rugged outer rim that is notched and incised from past impacts. A crater overlies the southwestern rim, and the two formations have merged to share a common interior floor. A pair of small craters lies along the southern part of the rim, and a small crater is also attached near the northern end. The interior floor has been resurfaced, so that it forms a wide plain that is pock-marked by numerous tiny craterlets and low hills. There is a small crater on the floor near the northeastern wall.

In 2009, it was discovered by NASA's Lunar Reconnaissance Orbiter that Hermite is the coldest place recorded in the solar system, with temperatures at 26 kelvins (−413 °F, −247 °C).  For comparison, Pluto's surface only gets down to about 43 kelvins (−382 °F, −229 °C).

Satellite craters
By convention these features are identified on lunar maps by placing the letter on the side of the crater midpoint that is closest to Hermite.

Hermite A

Possible water ice presence
There may exist a large amount of water ice within Hermite A's permanently shadowed region (PSR), where no light from the sun ever reaches; according to a 2016 study publishd by the IEEE roughly two-thirds of the crater's PSR is covered with varying amounts of ice. However, a 2018 study also published by the IEEE countered this claim, arguing that the method used to detect ice in the earlier study was not refined enough to conclusively identify a material as ice, and that more detailed methods were needed to determine if ice exists within Hermite A. A further analysis of the crater in 2022 using data from the Chandrayaan-1 and Chandrayaan-2 lunar orbiters found that ice may exist in clusters on the walls and some parts of the floor of Hermite A.

References

External links
 LAC-1 area - Map of northern lunar pole
 A Mystery Crater, Lunar Photo of the Day, January 3, 2007, featuring earth-based photo of Hermite.

Further reading
 
 
 
 
 
 
 
 
 
 
 
 

Impact craters on the Moon